Milovan Rajevac (Serbian: Милован Рајевац; born 2 January 1954) is a Serbian football manager and former professional player who is currently the technical director of Muangthong United.

Playing career

Born in Čajetina, Rajevac played as a defender for Borac Čačak, Red Star Belgrade, Vojvodina, Lunds BK, and the New York Arrows (as "Mike Rajevac") and Sloboda Užice.

Managerial career
Rajevac coached a number of club sides in his native Serbia, including Sloboda Užice, Red Star Belgrade, Vojvodina and Borac Čačak.

He became Ghana manager in August 2008. He continued the Black Stars's qualification campaign to 2010 World Cup. In the tournament, they almost reached the semi-final as they narrowly lost to Uruguay in the quarter-final via penalty shootout.

Rajevac quit Ghana after the World Cup on 8 September 2010, and took up a position with Saudi Arabian team Al-Ahli a day later.

He left the Saudi club in February 2011 to take up the role as national team coach for Qatar. He was relieved of duties in August 2011.

In September 2011, Rajevac was one of four managers linked with the Egyptian national team, and in February 2014 he was one of four managers linked with the Burkina Faso national team.

On 15 June 2016, he was officially appointed as manager of Rudar Velenje in Slovenia. However, on 26 June 2016 he was appointed as manager of the Algerian national team. He resigned from the position in October 2016, after two matches.

In April 2017, after the resignation of Kiatisuk Senamuang, he had an interview with Football Association of Thailand and was expected to become the head coach of the Thailand national football team. Eventually, he was appointed on one-year deal with an option for another one year by Football Association of Thailand on 26 April 2017.

On 5 February 2018, Football Association of Thailand announced the extension of Rajevac's contract to 2020.

He was sacked on 7 January 2019 following a 4–1 defeat against India in the 2019 AFC Asian Cup.

He returned to manage the Ghana national team for a second time in September 2021. He was sacked in January 2022 after the exit of the Black Stars at the delayed AFCON 2021 tournament.

In October 2022 he became the technical director of Muangthong United.

Honours

Manager
Thailand
King's Cup: 2017

Individual
Serbian Coach of the Year: 2010
African Coach of the Year: 2010

References

External links

1954 births
Living people
People from Čajetina
Yugoslav footballers
Serbian footballers
Association football defenders
FK Borac Čačak players
Red Star Belgrade footballers
FK Vojvodina players
FK Sloboda Užice players
Serbian football managers
Serbian expatriate football managers
Red Star Belgrade non-playing staff
Red Star Belgrade managers
FK Vojvodina managers
2010 FIFA World Cup managers
Expatriate football managers in Germany
Expatriate football managers in Ghana
Expatriate football managers in Qatar
Expatriate football managers in Saudi Arabia
Serbian SuperLiga managers
Serbian people of Bosnia and Herzegovina descent
Al-Ahli Saudi FC managers
Ghana national football team managers
Qatar national football team managers
FK Borac Čačak managers
FK Sloboda Užice managers
NK Rudar Velenje managers
Serbian expatriate sportspeople in Slovenia
Expatriate football managers in Slovenia
2010 Africa Cup of Nations managers
Algeria national football team managers
Thailand national football team managers
2019 AFC Asian Cup managers
Serbian expatriate sportspeople in Ghana